Oakthorpe Park is a small park and a larger, informal and transiently used neighbourhood name denoting a small fraction of the south of the London Borough of Enfield in Palmers Green, north London, UK. It is situated next to the North Circular.

Rarely marked on maps, the Oakthorpe Park neighbourhood corresponds to part of the 2004 to date  Bowes ward and its nearest train or underground stations are at Wood Green, Palmers Green, Bounds Green and Bowes Park.  The A406 road North Circular Road passes east–west through the north of the neighbourhood.

Nearest areas
Wood Green
Bowes Park
Edmonton
White Hart Lane (ward)
New Southgate

References

Areas of London
Districts of the London Borough of Enfield